Marcelė Kubiliūtė (July 28, 1898,  Tindžiuliai, now in Rokiškis district municipality, Lithuania – June 13, 1963, Vilnius), was a Lithuanian public figure, active in press, education and military areas. She is the only Lithuanian woman awarded all major Lithuanian orders.

After the second Soviet occupation of Lithuania in 1944, Kubiliūtė remained working in a library. On August 17, 1944 she was arrested by NKVD. For nine months, she was continuously interrogated, held in the KGB cellars starving. Later she was transferred to Lukiškės Prison. On July 7, 1946, Special Council of the NKVD sentenced her to 5 years in exile. Till 1949 she lived in exile in Tyumen, later in Akmola Region. After the expiration of the time of exile on September 30, Kubiliūtė departed to Lithuania where she was sheltered by Jonas Biliūnas' widow, Julija Biliūnienė. However, the tuberculosis acquired in exile has undermined health. Kubiliūtė was buried in the Rasos Cemetery next to the Lithuanian volunteers, whom she herself with her friend Elžbieta Matulionytė buried in 1920.

Decorations
1928: Grand Cross of Commander of the Order of the Cross of Vytis of second degree
1928: Officer's Cross of the Order of the Lithuanian Grand Duke Gediminas
1930: Knight's Cross of the Order of Vytautas the Great
1938: Commander's Cross of the Order of the Lithuanian Grand Duke Gediminas

References

"Dek, širdie, ant amžinojo aukuro...": Marcelės Kubiliūtės 100-sioms gimimo metinėms (1898 07 28 – 1963 06 13) paminėti, ed. Nastazija Kairiūkštytė, Lithuanian Institute of History, Vilnius, 1999

1898 births
1963 deaths
Commander's Crosses of the Order of the Lithuanian Grand Duke Gediminas
Recipients of the Order of Vytautas the Great
Commander's Grand Crosses of the Order of the Cross of Vytis
Lithuanian activists
Lithuanian educators
Lithuanian journalists
Lithuanian military personnel 
20th-century journalists
Burials at Rasos Cemetery